Princess Hours (lit. Palace) is a 2006 South Korean television series, starring Yoon Eun-hye, Ju Ji-hoon, Kim Jeong-hoon and Song Ji-hyo. It is based on Korean manhwa Goong by Park So-hee. It aired on MBC from January 11 to March 30, 2006 on Wednesdays and Thursdays at 21:55 for 24 episodes.

The show was the tenth most popular drama of 2006, with a peak rating of 28.3%. It also became a hit across Asia, contributing to the Korean Wave. Due to its success, a spin-off series, Prince Hours, was broadcast in 2007.

Synopsis

The show is set in an alternate, 21st-century Korea which has retained its monarchy and imperial family since 1945. The series focuses on the lives of Crown Prince Lee Shin of Korea, and his new bride, Chae-kyeong.

The series starts off with the news that Shin's father, Emperor Lee Hyeon of Korea, is seriously ill. There is a grim outlook on the Emperor's health, driving the imperial family to find Shin a suitable consort that will allow him to ascend to the throne if the situation requires. Despite being in love with the ambitious and talented ballerina Hyo-rin (whom he initially proposed to and was rejected), Prince Shin eventually marries a commoner to whom he was betrothed by his grandfather, the late Emperor Seongjo, in an agreement with the girl's grandfather. His new wife is the headstrong yet lovable Chae-kyeong, and despite initially feeling nothing for each other, love eventually blossoms between the couple.

Matters are further complicated with the return of Lee Yul and his mother, Lady Hwa-young, who was once Crown Princess before the death of her husband, the late Crown Prince Lee Soo, and older brother of the reigning Emperor. Yul and his mother were driven out of the palace some time after the death of his father, and it is revealed that this was because the Emperor discovered an affair between Lady Hwa-young and the current Emperor, who is his father's younger brother. Lady Hwa-young has returned to restore her son's place in the line of succession to the throne, which she believes remains rightfully his. A series of events befalls the palace with the schemes Yul's mother carries out, and these are further intensified by the various scandals involving the imperial family. Shin maintains an extramarital affair with his old flame, Hyo-rin, while Yul himself developing feelings for Chae-kyeong. Things get out of hand and the imperial family takes matters into their own hands.

Cast

Main

Yoon Eun-hye as Shin Chae-kyeong
A normal high school girl, who has an interest in drawing and art. Though seemingly immature, she is kind-hearted and honest. She is betrothed to Crown Prince Lee Shin, who attends the same high school as her, by the late Emperor Seongjo of Korea, who was best friends with her grandfather. Though she was initially annoyed by her seemingly unemotional new husband, Chae-kyeong gradually falls in love with him, not knowing that he harbours similar feelings. She sees Lee Yul as a close friend. At the end of the series, is revealed that Chae-kyeong is pregnant with Lee Shin's heir.

Ju Ji-hoon as Crown Prince Lee Shin 
A smug, indifferent and insensitive man, who is actually lonely on the inside. After getting rejected by his girlfriend Min Hyo-rin, he decides to proceed with his arranged marriage to Shin Chae-kyeong. Though he was initially annoyed by her naivete and enthusiasm, he gradually begins to open his heart to her. He owns a teddy bear called Alfred, the only 'companion' that allows him to let his guard down, and which serves as a focal point throughout the series. He quickly becomes rivals with Prince Lee Yul, who not only fights for the throne but also Chae-kyung's affection.

Kim Jeong-hoon as Prince Lee Yul 
The son of Crown Prince Soo. After his father's death, he was exiled to the United Kingdom with his mother, Lady Hwa-young. After returning to Korea, he fell in love with Shin Chae-kyeong, whom was initially betrothed to him. A kind-hearted and gentle person, Yul was not interested in fighting for the throne. He is best friends with Prince William.

Song Ji-hyo as Min Hyo-rin 
A talented and gifted ballet dancer. She is Shin's girlfriend, but rejected his proposal as she did not wish to give up on her dreams of becoming a star ballerina. When she sees Chae-kyeong and Shin's wedding and how much Chae-kyeong is loved by the people (similar to the rapport of Diana, Princess of Wales), she regrets her hasty decision, and does everything to win Shin back, including engineering a "chance" meeting in Thailand. She ends up hurting herself, driving her to attempted suicide by overdosing on pills. She later recognises that Shin does truly love Chae-kyeong, and ultimately concedes and instead decides to concentrate on her career as a ballerina.

Supporting

 Kim Hye-ja as the Dowager Empress/"Tae Hoo mama"
 Park Chan-hwan as Emperor Lee Hyeon of Korea 
Shim Hye-jin as Lady Hwa-young
Yul's mother, and the former Crown Princess.
 Yoon Yoo-sun as the Empress Consort/"Wang Hoo mama"
 Lee Yoon-ji as Princess Hye-myung
 Kang Nam-gil as Chae-kyeong's father
 Im Ye-jin as Chae-kyeong's mother
 Kim Seok as Shin Chae-joon
 Yeojin Jeon as Lee Kang-hyun
 Nah Eun-kyeong as Kim Soon-young
 Dan Ji as Yoon Hee-soong
 Choi Seong-joon as Kang-in
 Lee Yong-joo as Jang-kyung
 Uhm Seong-mo as Ryu-hwan 
 Lee Ho-jae as Gong Nae-kwan
 Jeon Su-yeon as Choi Sang Gung 
 Song Seung-hwan as Emperor
 Kim Sang-joong as Crown Prince Lee Soo, Yul's late father
 Choi Bool-am as Emperor Seongjo, Shin and Yul's late grandfather and father of Crown Prince Lee Soo and Emperor Lee Hyeon.

Original soundtrack

Ratings

Source: TNS Media Korea

Awards
2006 1st Seoul International Drama Awards: Best Art Director (Min Eon-ok)
2006 MBC Drama Awards: Best New Actor (Ju Ji-hoon)
2006 MBC Drama Awards: Best New Actress (Yoon Eun-hye)

International release

DVD
The US DVD release by YA Entertainment uses the title Palace.

Remakes and spin-offs

Prince Hours

A spin-off series, Goong S or Prince Hours, revolves around a young worker at a Chinese restaurant who suddenly discovers that he is a member of the imperial family and subsequently enters the palace. Hwang mentioned that he would be looking for Shin Chae-kyeong's male counterpart, of sorts. This spinoff has no relation to the first season, and had a new cast and plot.

In October 2006, Korean pop star Se7en was chosen to play the leading role in the spinoff. He will play the character of "Yi Hoo". The rest of the main cast are Huh E-jae (who plays the female protagonist Yang Soon-ae), Kang Doo (who plays Yi Joon), and Park Shin-hye (who plays Shin Sae-ryung). Many of the supporting cast, who played minor characters, reprised their roles. Filming started in November 2006.

The name for the spin-off changed from Goong 2 to Goong S – Prince Hours (궁 S) due to copyright infringement problems. Filming continued despite Group 8 facing lawsuits due to the unlawful use of Goong in the title. However, MBC has looked into this issue with Eight Peaks and have stated that the channel station and original production company both own the rights of the name. Goong S will still be used for this season, with the subtitle of "Prince Who". Goong S was broadcast from January 10 to March 15, 2007, to moderate success.

Goong: The Musical
This drama was later adapted into a musical titled Goong: The Musical (Hangul: 뮤지컬 궁). Producer Song Byung-joon, CEO of production company Group Eight, collaborated with the drama's screenwriter In Eun-ah for the stage rendition, and also brought in theater director Kim Jae-sung. The creative team constructed flamboyant stage sets, which were visualized through digital devices to show off the dramatic effects and fantasies on stage. A variety of music genres from traditional court music, classics, hip-hop and jazz was used, along with varying dance styles such as ballet, court dances and b-boy.

When the musical debuted at the Yong Theater at the National Museum of Korea in September 2010, the lead role of Crown Prince Lee Shin was played by U-Know Yunho of TVXQ.

Kim Kyu-jong of SS501 played Shin during the musical's run at the Minami-za Kabuki Theater in Kyoto, Japan in June–July 2011, and Kangin of Super Junior alternated with Sungmo of Supernova to take over the role at the Gotanda U-Port Hall in Tokyo, Japan in September 2012.

In 2014, Shinee's Taemin, ZE:A's Kim Dongjun, U-KISS Soohyun and Hoon alternately played the part of Prince Lee Shin in the Japan run of Goong held from May 10 to 24 (25 stages) in Akasaka ACT Theater, Tokyo, Japan.

Remakes
In 2006, Benci Bilang Cinta starring Andriani Marshanda and Baim Wong, aired in Indonesia.

In 2017, Princess Hours Thailand (Thai title: รักวุ่นๆ เจ้าหญิงจอมจุ้น) is broadcast on True4U. The starring is Ungsumalynn Sirapatsakmetha as Khaning and Sattaphong Phiangphor as Crown Prince Inn.

On March 5, 2021, Group 8 has been announced that the drama will have its second Korean adaptation.

See also
 Korean royalty

References

External links
 Princess Hours official MBC website  
 Princess Hours at MBC Global Media
 
 
 Goong: Musical official website 

2006 South Korean television series debuts
2006 South Korean television series endings
Alternate history television series
Korean-language television shows
MBC TV television dramas
South Korean alternate history
South Korean romantic comedy television series
South Korean teen dramas
Television shows based on manhwa
Television shows set in Bangkok
Television series set in the 21st century
Television series about princesses
South Korean high school television series
South Korean television series remade in other languages